Abdiaziz Nur Elmi Koor is a Somali politician. He is the current Mayor of Garowe, the administrative capital of the autonomous Puntland region in northeastern Somalia. Koor was appointed to the position in September 2009.

References

Ethnic Somali people
Living people
Mayors of places in Somalia
Year of birth missing (living people)